The West Australian Football Commission is the governing body of Australian rules football in the state of Western Australia.

Operations
The WAFC was formed in 1989 to manage the sport in Western Australia. The commission is registered as a not-for-profit association.

The commission assists in administering the West Australian Football League and is the owner of Australian Football League teams Fremantle Football Club and West Coast Eagles.

See also
Australian rules football in Western Australia
Australian rules football 
Australian Football League

References

Australian rules football governing bodies
Australian rules football in Western Australia
Football
Sports organizations established in 1989